Dubai Safari Park is an eco-friendly safari park located in Dubai, United Arab Emirates. The park's major source of energy is solar energy. The Park is located on Al Warqa 5 on the Hatta Road. The park has 3000 animals from more than 250 species. The park replaced the Dubai Zoo on its 50th anniversary. The park plans to increase the animal number to 5000 by 2020. On May 15, 2018, the Park closed for renovations and improvements until being reopened in October 2020.

History 
The old Dubai zoo was replaced by Dubai Safari Park when It only had a collection of 1000 animals. The park consists of 12.8 Million square feet of area. The old park had faced criticism internationally about the conditions the animals were kept in Caged up, very little space, barely able to move. It was obvious that there had to be a much larger, more open, more modern habitat for the animals. Keeping in mind the tourism increase in Dubai, the municipality took the decision of increasing and moderating the Dubai zoo. $40.8 million were allocated to the project. The Project was given to Meraas, a UAE conglomerate. Parques Reunidos is hired as operation manager. The Park was opened on 12 December 2017 but closed for renovations and improvements in May 2018.

Villages 

The Park have major five Areas named as Explorer village, Arabian Desert Safari, Asian Village, African Village and Wadi Village.

African Village 
Here are kept the white lion and African wild dog.

Explorer Village 
Explorer village is an open area where visitors can go by bus and have an amazing close encounter with animals including giraffes, lions and tigers.

 Safari Journey A unique experience where you will embark on a drive-thru adventure and have the opportunity to spot animals from Africa and Asia from a close range inside one of our Safari Buses. You will be accompanied by our knowledgeable guides, who will talk about the animals, answer your questions and feed your curiosity with interesting stories and fun facts.

Asian Village 
Animals from Asia are part of this village, including the Komodo dragon and Indian elephant.

 Arabian Desert Safari Spanning over 60,000 square meters, the Arabian Village is a dedicated to observe and learn about the native wildlife, like the Arabian oryx and wolf. This area is designed containing the mountains, deserts, flowers and plants.

The Wadi 
This is an area for relaxation. The area is created for relaxation after the long safari visit. The ground is lush green while there is ponds of fishes where you can watch fishes or waterfalls.

Kids Farm 
It is a newly created section with a view kept in mind of learning for children.

See also 
 Al Ain Zoo
 Al Hefaiyah Conservation Centre
 Breeding Centre for Endangered Wildlife, Sharjah
 Dubai Dolphinarium
 Dubai Zoo
 Emirates Park Zoo
 Tourism in Dubai
 Tourist attractions in Dubai

References

External References 
 Official website of Dubai Safari Park

Zoos in the United Arab Emirates
2017 establishments in the United Arab Emirates
Zoos established in 2017
Tourist attractions in Dubai